Stuart J. Rowan (born 1969) is a Scottish chemist.

Early life and education 
Stuart Rowan was born in Edinburgh in 1969, and raised in Troon, South Ayrshire. He completed a bachelors of science in chemistry at the University of Glasgow.

Mr. Rowan earned his doctorate under the direction of David D. MacNicol in 1995.

In 1994, before Mr. Rowan had finished his doctoral studies in Glasgow, he began working for Jeremy Sanders at the University of Cambridge.

In 1996, Mr. Rowan was named a research associate for Girton College, Cambridge.

Career 
In 1998 Mr. Rowan left the United Kingdom to continue his postdoctoral research with Fraser Stoddart at the University of California, Los Angeles.

He then joined the Case Western Reserve University's Department of Macromolecular Science and Engineering in 1999 as an assistant professor, he was promoted to associate professor in 2005, and full professor in 2008, and the Kent Hale Smith Professor of Engineering.

In 2016 Professor Rowan joined the Pritzker School of Molecular Engineering at the University of Chicago as well as UChicago's Department of Chemistry, and accepted an appointment as the Barry L. MacLean Professor for Molecular Engineering Innovation and Enterprise in 2018.

While on the faculty of the University of Chicago, Professor Rowan also held a position at the Argonne National Laboratory.

Professor Rowan is the founding deputy editor of the journal ACS Macro Letters, and succeeded Timothy P. Lodge as chief editor in 2018.

In 2002 Prof. Stuart Rowan received a National Science Foundation award, 2007, and 2016. )see below)

"Prof. Stuart Rowan of the University of Chicago develops synthetic methods that allow access to new polymer architectures and studies how these architectures impact polymer properties. This research has potential societal benefit with regards to design and preparation of novel polymeric materials with desirable unique properties. The project involves graduate and undergraduate students, high school students from a local girl's high school, and students of under-represented groups from the inner city Cleveland Municipal School District (through the Envoys program). The integrated approach of this research provides students at all levels with an exciting learning environment and broad research experiences. In addition, Prof. Rowan and his research group design new demonstrations for the outreach program entitled "Natures Materials", which is part of the Cleveland Museum's "Winter Discovery Day" on Dr. Martin Luther King Jr. Day. This program aims (i) to expose the local community to polymers and how Nature's materials can help us create a sustainable planet, and (ii) to train current graduate students on how to communicate and educate the general public and younger students about science and technology.

This research project, which is supported by the Macromolecular, Supramolecular and Nanochemistry Program of the Chemistry Division, encompasses synthetic and metal-coordination chemistry, computational modeling, as well as polymer science and characterization. It focuses on the design, synthesis and characterization of polymers with doubly-threaded architectures where two chains are threaded through one macrocycle. The new synthetic methodology utilizes metal-ligand coordination as the thermodynamic driving force for the polymerization step and either dynamic covalent chemistry (in the form of ring closing metathesis) as the covalent fixing step to access the poly[n]catenanes or high yielding thiolene chemistry to access the doubly threaded poly[3]rotaxanes and slide ring gels. The polymers will have the ability to expand/contract without significantly altering bond or torsion angles and as such it is predicted they will exhibit unusual viscoelastic properties."

In 2010 he was granted fellowship of the Royal Society of Chemistry, is also a fellow of the American Chemical Society,.

References

1969 births
Living people
Scientists from Edinburgh
20th-century Scottish scientists
21st-century Scottish scientists
20th-century British chemists
21st-century British chemists
People from Troon
Alumni of the University of Glasgow
Case Western Reserve University faculty
University of Chicago faculty
Scottish expatriates in the United States
Argonne National Laboratory people
Fellows of the Royal Society of Chemistry
Fellows of the American Chemical Society
Academic journal editors
Polymer scientists and engineers
Scottish physical chemists